Beit Kama (lit. House of Standing Grain) is a kibbutz in the northern Negev desert in Israel. Located north of the Bedouin city of Rahat, it falls under the jurisdiction of Bnei Shimon Regional Council.

History
The kibbutz was founded on 18 April 1949, south-east of the Palestinian  village al-Jammama, which had been  depopulated on 22 May 1948 during the 1948 Arab–Israeli War.  The founders of Beit Kama were immigrants from Hungary who belonged to Hashomer Hatzair movement.

The settlement was initially called "Safiach", but later became Beit Kama, a name derived from Isaiah 17:5: "And it shall be as when the reaper gathers standing grain."

Beit Kama is a secular kibbutz affiliated with HaKibbutz HaArtzi and Hashomer Hatzair.

Economy

Kamada, a plasma-derived biopharmaceutical company, was established in Beit Kama in 1990. Its first product was human albumen. Kamada's production facilities are located on the kibbutz.

Archaeology
In 2013, archaeologists of the Israel Antiquities Authority discovered a Byzantine era mosaic floor on the grounds of the kibbutz. The red, black, and yellow mosaic is decorated with images of birds, local flora and geometrical designs. An ancient water system with pools and channels was also unearthed.

References

Kibbutzim
Kibbutz Movement
Populated places established in 1949
Populated places in Southern District (Israel)
1949 establishments in Israel